Green Crescent Trust (GCT) is a non-profit organization in Sindh, Pakistan that focuses on education and development. It was established in 1995 by group of people with just one goal: making a better Pakistan through education. It started out with just one school and handful of students in Karachi.

Today, GCT aims to making schools a reality for deserving children in underprivileged areas of Sindh. It has expanded their schools network making them more accessible to these children.

Introduction 
GCT is a professional non-profit organization operated by professionals under the supervision of the Board of Trustees, which runs schools in underprivileged areas of Sindh for the boys and girls in the rural and urban areas. The founders took this initiative with a very few number of students.

Now with the same passion and enthusiasm, bestowed on that first school, GCT has managed to expand their journey of education and expended their chain of schools in all over Sindh. GCT aims to bring a behavioral change in the communities regarding quality education, community building, and motivation and providing opportunities to bring enhancements in their daily lives. For that they have expanded their services in Orphan Support Program, Centre for Educational Research and Development (CERD) for teachers training and Development, The Water Project for the people of Tharparkar.

It is profoundly difficult in rural areas of Sindh to encourage families to gain education, especially for females. Hence, to achieve this, GCT hires the female staff from within the community and trains them for community mobilization, which greatly helps in convincing the parents to send their children to school. GCT has managed to increase female ratio from 20% to 40% in last 3 years.

Hilal Public School System 

Hilal Public School System (HPSS) run by GCT since 1995 was initiated with just one school.  HPSS is a network of curriculum-based schools providing subsidized education to underprivileged children across Sindh. HPSS is running 165 schools successfully all over the Sindh with more than 1200 teachers and 33,000 students.

Center for Educational Research and Development 

Center for Educational Research and Development (CERD) is the professional training and development center for Teachers and Parents. CERD is providing training to all the GCT Teachers and Parents to bring about a substantial change in their lives through Education. CERD also provides training to other NGOs, Non-Profit Organizations and Charities.

Water Project 

Water is one of the main and basic essences of every human.  People of Tharparkar (Sindh, Pakistan) are starving for water, not only for them and their families, but also for the cattle they breed as their means of livelihood. The females of Tharparkar travel a minimum of 3 km daily in scorching heat for search of water for their families.

GCT realized the need of water, when they found out that most of students of HPSS, are not in good health in the Tharparkar region. They took the initiative in 2014 and up till now the GCT has installed 430 water projects, which covers almost 90,000 beneficiaries. Every village now has their own project, providing a safe reliable source of water right outside their homes.

Orphan Support Program 

Orphan Support Program (OSP) with the help of donors to help fulfilling the need of education, ethical and moral, health and sustenance need of orphans. Under OSP more than 1600 Orphans are getting supported. The four main elements are:

 Subsistence: monthly ration, clothes, hygiene kits
 Education: school fee, books, stationary, uniforms, shoes
 Health: proper medical checkups, referrals
 Social Activities: picnics, visits to amusement places, confidence building, art and creativity encouragement.

GCT Book Bank 

GCT along with quality education also provides the necessities of education to the deserving students. GCT Book Bank is the program in which books are purchased for the students who could not afford them.

These books are then laminated and made a hard cover, which increases their lifespan to 3 to 4 years, ensuring recycling and avoiding paper waste.

Donations 

Being a non-profit organization, the main source of income is from donations, with most of the sources coming from Pakistan, which included corporate and development sectors.

Almost 70% of the donations are utilized in education like building and running schools, providing basic equipment, computer and science labs, library books, uniforms and course books. The rest of the donations include 20% in OSP, CERD and Water Project and 10% is allocated for administration cost.

References 
 https://www.ubldirect.com/corporate/Portals/_default/Skins/DarkKnight/_ui/pdf/GreenCrescentTrustandUBLOmniPR.pdf
 https://web.archive.org/web/20150815230800/http://educationfundforsindh.com/education-fund-for-sindhandgreen/
 http://www.afkarachi.com/spip.php?article586

External links 
 Green Crescent Trust

Non-profit organisations based in Pakistan
Organisations based in Sindh
Education in Sindh